James Erroll Dunsford Boyd (November 22, 1891 – November 27, 1960) was a pioneering Canadian aviator. He was known as the "Lindbergh of Canada" before becoming an American citizen in 1941.

Biography
James Erroll Dunsford Boyd, known to his family and friends as "Erroll", was born on November 22, 1891 in Toronto, Ontario, Canada. During World War I he was a flyer with the Royal Naval Air Service.

On October 9–10, 1930, Boyd became the first Canadian to fly an airplane from Canada to England (Harbour Grace to Tresco, Isles of Scilly).

He became an American citizen on March 28, 1941, in Hartford, Connecticut.

Boyd died on November 27, 1960 in Sharon, Connecticut. He was buried in Pompano Beach South Lawn Cemetery in Pompano Beach, Florida.

Awards and honours
In 2017, Boyd was posthumously inducted into the Canada's Aviation Hall of Fame.

Footnotes

Further reading
 Ross Smyth, The Lindberg of Canada: The Erroll Boyd Story. Burnstown, ON: General Store Publishing House, 1997.

External links

For Love and Liberty, a patriotic song and chorus at the Library of Congress

1891 births
1960 deaths
People from Old Toronto
Canadian aviators
Canadian Aviation Hall of Fame inductees
Canadian emigrants to the United States